The Maliboomer was an attraction at the Paradise Pier section of Disney California Adventure at the Disneyland Resort in Anaheim, California, US. Manufactured by S&S Power, Mailboomer was a Space Shot attraction, meaning it launched guests from the bottom of the tower instead of slowly lifting them to the top and dropping them from there.  The ride was pneumatically powered, with three connected towers, each with its own independent ride system. It also contained "Scream Shields", used to block the screams from reaching residents of Anaheim and neighboring Garden Grove as the park is located near a residential area.

History

In the late 1990s, Disney wanted to build a cheaper theme park next to Disneyland with the use of off-the-shelf rides. One of these attractions would be a drop tower named Maliboomer. The concept came from a space-themed version of the High striker attraction on many boardwalks and carnivals. The name also hinted at this theme, since it alludes to the beach town of Malibu, California. In 1998, Disney revealed more details about the new park, including the name Disney California Adventure. Maliboomer would be a Space Shot ride built by S&S Power and feature three towers. Construction of Maliboomer would begin one year later in 1999.

Maliboomer officially opened to the general public on February 8, 2001 along with the park.

As part of the park's multi-year, $1.1 billion expansion, Maliboomer was originally planned to be refurbished, but it was later announced that the ride would not survive the park's expansion. On August 6, 2010, Disney California Adventure announced that Maliboomer would be closing. The ride's last operating day was September 7, 2010 and the dismantling of the attraction began shortly afterwards. 

The ride's former concrete pad and railings remained for several years and its spot was used for character meet and greets and a smoking area. On June 28, 2019, the Inside Out Emotional Whirlwind attraction, inspired by Disney·Pixar's Inside Out, opened in the space where Maliboomer once stood.

In other media 
There is a Roblox Theme park tycoon 2 youtuber of the same name.

References

Disney California Adventure
Drop tower rides
Former Walt Disney Parks and Resorts attractions
Amusement rides manufactured by S&S – Sansei Technologies
Towers completed in 2001
Paradise Pier
2001 establishments in California
2010 disestablishments in California